Synanthedon beutenmuelleri is a moth of the family Sesiidae. It is known from the Republic of the Congo.

Taxonomy
Synanthedon beutenmuelleri is a replacement name for Sesia albiventris Beutenmüller, 1899, since this name was already occupied by Chamaesphecia albiventris.

References

Endemic fauna of the Republic of the Congo
Sesiidae
Fauna of the Republic of the Congo
Moths of Africa
Moths described in 1981